TRR may refer to:

 Society for Family Development (Towarzystwo Rozwoju Rodziny), a Polish organization
 Target row refresh, a computer hardware feature used to prevent the row hammer effect in DDR4 memory
 Taushiro language (ISO 639:trr), a language isolate of the Peruvian Amazon
 Tehran Research Reactor, an Iranian nuclear research reactor, supplied by the U.S. in 1960
 Thai Roong Ruang, a sugar producer
 Three Rivers Review, a literary magazine published by the University of Pittsburgh
 Tom Rhodes Radio, an interview podcast
 TRR is the station code for Torre railway station in Devon, England
 Trottoir roulant rapide, a moving walkway in the Montparnasse–Bienvenüe Metro station, France
 TRR College of Engineering, Patancheru, Hyderabad, India
 Trusted Recursive Resolver, a DNS-resolving server operated by Mozilla for using DNS over HTTPS in the Firefox web browser
 Tuckerton Railroad (reporting mark TRR), a former railroad that operated in New Jersey, United States
 Tulsa Rig, Reel, and Manufacturing Company, a predecessor company of Flintco
 China Bay Airport (IATA: TRR), near Trincomalee, Sri Lanka